Alice Anderson (born 1972) is a French-British artist who studied Fine Art at the École nationale supérieure des Beaux-Arts in Paris and Goldsmiths College, London. She currently lives and works in London. Anderson works primarily with copper-coloured wire, colour paint, oil pastel, corten steel, and is associated with the Postdigital movement: as a way of finding spirituality through the developing technologies. James Bridle:

Work
Alice Anderson was mainly known for her films until 2007 when she started to create objects and sculptures with elements of her own body.

In 2011, Anderson's practice took a new direction following her personal exhibition at the Freud Museum in London, where she worked on Anna Freud’s loom and initiated geometrical works of lines and grids in the spirit of Agnes Martin. This is also when Anderson began to use copper wire.

With the ‘Wire’ project, Anderson wound copper wire around the objects, furniture and architectural elements in her London studio. On her relationships to objects, Anderson says, "I always worry about breaking or losing an object, therefore I have established rules: When one of the object around me is likely to become obsolete or is lost in the stream of our lives, I memorise it with wire before it happens. If an object breaks, I encapsulate it in steel, I leave it outside for few weeks until it rusts, then I perform a ritual and when the dance is over, everything is repaired. The broken relation is healed".

In 2015 she exhibited her objects in copper wire at the Wellcome Collection in London. Jonathan Jones of The Guardian described the work as "glutinous in the memory. The reason it works is because she takes the whole thing so stupendously seriously. This is passionate, obsessive, intensely concentrated work." Visitors were asked to help the artist record a Ford Mustang in wire through a collective sculpture. Anderson also uses rough material such as recycled steel and works with metallic meshes to create sculptures from repetitive gestures.

Anderson's works make prevalent use of copper wire, a signature material which originated from the artist being drawn to copper wire's 'shiny, hypnotic' properties which triggered the thought that copper represents the connectivity of a digital world and provide a means of 'memorising' objects. Anderson's first large-scale project using copper thread was to bind the façade of the Freud Museum with 3000 metres of thread in 'Housebound' (2011), which replicated the entire length of digital cables found within the site. Abstracting the innards of architecture to its digital nervous system, Anderson proceeded to apply this action to foundational structures within architecture: replicating, deconstructing and appropriating transitional structures such as stairs, windows and lifts housed within the host building. Through the process of 'memorising' the structures with copper wire, the elements are printed, contorted and displaced, often to points beyond immediate recognition. This body of works within Anderson's practice is termed 'Architectures Data'.

In September 2012, Anderson founded Alice Anderson's Travelling Studio after a debut performance at the Whitechapel Gallery in London.
In 2013, Alice Anderson's sculptures were featured at the 55th Venice Biennale. In 2013/2014, Anderson's work was shown at London's Freud Museum in a group exhibition Parallels have also been drawn between Anderson and the Post Minimalism movement. In 2015 Anderson participated in solo exhibitions at Wellcome Collection London and Espace Culturel Louis Vuitton, Paris. In 2016 Anderson installed a series of permanent sculptures at the Eiffel Historical Building in Paris, as well as a series of large-scale sculptures in a group show at the Saatchi Gallery, in London. In 2017, Anderson exhibited in a solo exhibition at UNIT9, London and began a series of performances at Centre Pompidou, who acquired her performance-generated sculpture, 'Floorboards data', for their permanent collection in 2018.

In 2020, Alice Anderson has been nominated for the Prix Marcel Duchamp.

Further reading

Sabine Mirlesse: Alice Anderson: “The body is at the centre of my practice”, Interview for the Musee National D'art Moderne, 2020 

Marie Maertens, Sacred Gestures in Data Words, La Patinoire Royale, Brussels, 2020

Annabelle Gugnon, La Patinoire Royale, Brussels, 2018 

TL magazine, 2018 

Elephant Magazine  

Alice Anderson, Centre Pompidou Document 

GLASS MAGAZINE, Allie Nawrat, 2017  UNIT 9 

THE TRANSFORMATIVE OBJECT AT THE ROYAL ACADEMY OF ARTS, 2017 

Alice Anderson: Post-Digital, Paul Carey Kent, 2016 

Time Capsules, Joanna S. Walker, 2016 

Recording The Present, Espace Culturel Louis Vuitton Paris by J. de Gonet, 2015 

Notes on Sculptures, Olivier Lussac, 2015 

The Art of Memory, Wellcome Collection by Kate Forde, 2015 

The Science of Perception, by Israel Rosenfield, 2015 

Performing Life, Françoise Mamie, 2013 

ARTPRESS, Alice Anderson by Annabelle Gugnon, October 2015

References

External links 

1972 births
Living people
British contemporary artists
English sculptors
British women sculptors
Alumni of Goldsmiths, University of London
21st-century British women artists